Arc measurement, sometimes degree measurement, is the astrogeodetic technique of determining of the radius of Earth – more specifically, the local Earth radius of curvature of the figure of the Earth – by relating the latitude difference (sometimes also the longitude difference) and the geographic distance (arc length) surveyed between two locations on Earth's surface. The most common variant involves only astronomical latitudes and the meridian arc length and is called meridian arc measurement; other variants may involve only astronomical longitude (parallel arc measurement) or both geographic coordinates (oblique arc measurement).
Arc measurement campaigns in Europe were the precursors to the International Association of Geodesy (IAG).

History

The first known arc measurement was performed by Eratosthenes (240 BC) between Alexandria and Syene in what is now Egypt, determining the radius of the Earth with remarkable correctness. 
In the early 8th century, Yi Xing performed a similar survey.

The French physician Jean Fernel measured the arc in 1528. The Dutch geodesist Snellius (~1620) repeated the experiment between Alkmaar and Bergen op Zoom using more modern geodetic instrumentation (Snellius' triangulation).

Later arc measurements aimed at determining the flattening of the Earth ellipsoid by measuring at different geographic latitudes. The first of these was the French Geodesic Mission, commissioned by the French Academy of Sciences in 1735–1738, involving measurement expeditions to Lapland (Maupertuis et al.) and Peru (Pierre Bouguer et al.).

Struve measured a geodetic control network via triangulation between the Arctic Sea and the Black Sea, the Struve Geodetic Arc. 
Bessel compiled several meridian arcs, to compute the famous Bessel ellipsoid (1841).

Nowadays, the method is replaced by worldwide geodetic networks and by satellite geodesy.

List of other instances 
 Al-Ma'mun's arc measurement
 Posidonius' arc measurement
 Swedish–Russian Arc-of-Meridian Expedition
 Picard's arc measurement
 Dunkirk-Collioure arc measurement (Cassini, Cassini, and de La Hire)
 Dunkirk-Collioure arc measurement (Cassini de Thury and de Lacaille)
 Meridian arc of Delambre and Méchain
 West Europe-Africa Meridian-arc
 De Lacaille's arc measurement
 Fernel's arc measurement
 Norwood's arc measurement
 Boscovich and Maire's arc measurement
 Maclear's arc measurement
 Hopfner's arc measurement

Determination
The empirical Earth's meridional radius of curvature at the midpoint of the meridian arc can then be determined as:

where  is the arc length on mean sea level (MSL).

Historically, the distance between two places has been determined at low precision by pacing or odometry.
High precision land surveys can be used to determine the distance between two places at nearly the same longitude by measuring a baseline and a triangulation network linking fixed points. The meridian distance  from one end point to a fictitious point at the same latitude as the second end point is then calculated by trigonometry. The surface distance  is reduced to the corresponding distance at MSL,  (see: Geographical distance#Altitude correction).

Two arc measurements at different latitudinal bands serve to determine Earth's flattening.

See also 
 Astrogeodesy
 Earth ellipsoid
 Geodesy
 Gradian#Relation to the metre
 History of geodesy
 Spherical Earth#History
 Meridian arc#History
 Earth's circumference#History
 Meridian arc
 Paris Meridian

References

Geodetic surveys